The 2004–05 season of the Philippine Basketball League (PBL).

2004-05 Open Championships

Montaña vs Granny Goose (Best-of-three semis)

Magnolia vs Welcoat (Best-of-three semis)

Open finals

Montaña won their first-ever PBL title by blasting the Welcoat Paintmasters, 79-65, in the deciding fifth game of their series, the Jewels leaned on another shooting performance from finals MVP Alex Compton, who finish with a game-high 26 points, and also got gritty plays from veteran playmaker Froilan Baguion, who shot 13 points and pulled off three steals. Leo Najorda led Welcoat's charge with 20 points while Welcoat star Anthony Washington struggled offensively for the second straight game after stellar performances early in the finals series.

Individual awards (Open)
 Most Valuable Player: Jondan Salvador (Montaña)
 Finals MVP: Alex Compton (Montaña)
 Scoring Sensation Plum:  Mark Cardona (ICTSI-La Salle)
 Defensive Stopper Award: JR Quiñahan (Granny Goose)
 Mr. Intangible: Eugene Tan (Welcoat)
 True Gentleman: Jenkins Mesina (Addict Mobile-Ateneo)
 Instant Impact: Al Vergara (Montaña)
 Mythical Five
 Jondan Salvador (Montaña)
 Jay Washington (Welcoat)
 Arwind Santos (Magnolia)
 JR Quiñahan (Granny Goose)
 Mark Cardona (ICTSI-La Salle)
 Mythical Second Team
 Warren Ybañez (Magnolia)
 Denok Miranda (Magnolia)
 Marvin Ortiguerra (Welcoat)
 Al Magpayo (Montaña)
 Ariel Capus (Montaña)

2005 Unity Cup

In a double-playoff game on May 24, Magnolia beat Toyota, 81–76, to clinch 4th-seed. Welcoat beat Harbour, 92–87, for 2nd-seed.

In the twice-to-beat advantage in the quarterfinal round on May 26, sixth-seeded Granny Goose forces a knockout game against third-seeded Harbour, 78–76. Magnolia advances in the final four, repeating over fifth-seeded Toyota-Otis, 66–53.

On May 28, Granny Goose eliminates Harbour with a 75–60 win.

Semifinal series

Top-seeded teams' Montaña and Welcoat needed just two wins in the series to enter the finals while Magnolia and Granny Goose must win three games.

Unity Cup finals

After a string of runner-up finishes, Welcoat Paints collected the PBL Unity Cup championship with a 98-80 victory over Montaña in Game 4 for a 3-1 series victory. Finals MVP Jay Washington pumped in 25 points and grabbed 12 rebounds to lead the Paintmasters to their first title since 2002.

Unity Cup awards
 Most Valuable Player: Mark Cardona (Harbour)
 Fantastic Freshman Award: Paolo Orbeta (Welcoat)
 Finals MVP: Jay Washington (Welcoat)
 Mythical Five
 Mark Cardona (Harbour)
 Jay Washington (Welcoat)
 Arwind Santos (Magnolia)
 JR Quiñahan (Granny Goose)
 Jondan Salvador (Montaña)
 Mythical Second Team
 LA Tenorio (Harbour)
 Denok Miranda (Magnolia)
 Leo Najorda (Welcoat)
 Yousif Aljamal (Nenaco)
 Froilan Baguion (Montaña)

References

External links
 www.philippinebasketball.ph

Philippine Basketball League seasons
2004–05 in Philippine basketball
PBL